The Mbunda Kingdom (Mbunda: Chiundi ca Mbunda or Vumwene vwa Chiundi or Portuguese: Reino dos Bundas) was an African kingdom located in west central Africa, what is now south-east Angola. At its greatest extent, it reached from Mithimoyi in the central Moxico to the Cuando Cubango Province in the south-east, bordering with Namibia. The kingdom was ruled by Mwene wa Chiundi (King).

The kingdom was ultimately conquered in a war with Portugal in 1917, called the Kolongongo War.

See also
Mbunda people

References

Former monarchies of Africa
Former kingdoms
Countries in precolonial Africa
18th century in Angola
19th century in Angola
1900s in Angola
1910s in Angola
Cuando Cubango Province
Moxico Province
States and territories established in 1700
States and territories disestablished in 1914
1700 establishments in Africa
1914 disestablishments in Africa